The Welsh Boat Race, also known as the Welsh University Boat Race and The Welsh Varsity Boat Race, is an annual rowing race in Wales between the Swansea University Rowing Club and the Cardiff University Rowing Club, rowed between competing eights each spring since 2006 on the River Tawe or River Taff in South Wales.

Background
The Welsh Boat Race started in 2006. with just a senior men's and women's event and as popularity grew for the event and particularly the Swansea University Rowing Club grew in numbers (having been recently reinstated), a Novice event was added for both men and women in their first year of rowing.

The race was held on a Wednesday, to complement the Welsh Varsity event and continued this way until 2009. It was then moved to a weekend date to enable more people to attend.

The 2010 Welsh Boat Race was held on the River Tawe, in Swansea on Saturday 24 April. The aim was to alternate the venue between the two university rivers, but with superior facilities in Cardiff, it has been the venue of choice since. It was again held on the River Tawe, Swansea, in 2015 and 2016, the event returning to the River Taff, Cardiff in 2017.

For the first time, in 2017 Swansea won the overall series of Welsh Varsity Boat Races.

The 2020 and 2021 Welsh Varsity Boat Races were cancelled due to the COVID-19 pandemic

Winners

Men's race

2006 - Cardiff
2007 - Cardiff
2008 - Cardiff
2009 - Swansea
2010 - Swansea
2011 - Cardiff
2012 - Cardiff
2013 - Cardiff
2014 - Swansea
2015 - Swansea
2016 - Swansea
2017 - Swansea
2018 - Swansea
2019 - Swansea
2020 - No race
2021 - No race
2022 - Swansea

Women's race

2006 - Cardiff
2007 - Cardiff
2008 - Cardiff
2009 - Cardiff
2010 - Cardiff
2011 - Cardiff
2012 - Cardiff
2013 - Cardiff
2014 - Cardiff
2015 - Cardiff
2016 - Cardiff
2017 - Cardiff
2018 - Cardiff
2019 - Cardiff
2020 - No race
2021 - No race
2022 - Cardiff

Men's novices race

2006 - No race
2007 - No race
2008 - No race
2009 - Cardiff
2010 - Cardiff
2011 - Cardiff
2012 - Swansea
2013 - Cardiff
2014 - Cardiff
2015 - Cardiff
2016 - Cardiff
2017 - Swansea
2018 - Swansea
2019 - Cardiff
2020 - No race
2021 - No race
2022 - Cardiff

Women's novices race

2006 - No race
2007 - No race
2008 - No race
2009 - Cardiff
2010 - Cardiff
2011 - Cardiff
2012 - Cardiff
2013 - Cardiff
2014 - Cardiff
2015 - Cardiff
2016 - Cardiff
2017 - Swansea
2018 - Cardiff
2019 - Cardiff
2020 - No race
2021 - No race
2022 - Cardiff

Race reports:
2007,

2010

The Cardiff University RC have been established for some years. As such they have a solid club structure and boating facilities and have claimed the majority of the wins. Swansea University RC was reformed in 2004, and since then, they have claimed 9 Senior Men's wins in 2009, 2010, 2014-2022 (no races in 2020 and 2021 due to pandemic), 2 Novice men's wins in 2012 and 2017 as well as for the first time a win by the Women in the Novice category in 2017. Since Swansea University Rowing Club have been receiving comparable funding the results have started to even out with the 2022 results being the 7th consecutive win for the SURC senior men. Since 2016, there has been a mixed alumni race held over a shorter distance and Cardiff University have won 2 races so far and Swansea University won the alumni race for the first time on home water in 2022.  Cardiff's Senior Women still remain unbeaten in this event as of 2022.

Course

The course was rowed on the lower reaches of the River Taff from south of the Railway Arches bridge to Cardiff Bay over approximately 2 kilometres. In 2010 the venue changed to the River Tawe's slightly straighter course of again approximately 2 km from the old Hafod Copperworks to the Sail Bridge, returning in 2015, 2016, 2018 and 2022. After 2010 (with the exception of 2015/16) it returned to the River Taff. The course length is restricted due to the available rivers in the South Wales region. The current trend is to now host the Boat Race in the city where all the Varsity matches are taking place a couple of weekends before Varsity Wednesday. Rowers can also compete in the shorter distance regatta season.

2006 - River Taff (Cardiff)
2007 - River Taff (Cardiff)
2008 - River Taff (Cardiff)
2009 - River Taff (Cardiff)
2010 - River Tawe (Swansea)
2011 - River Taff (Cardiff)
2012 - River Taff (Cardiff)
2013 - River Taff (Cardiff)
2014 - River Taff (Cardiff)
2015 - River Tawe (Swansea)
2016 - River Tawe (Swansea)
2017 - River Taff (Cardiff)
2018 - River Tawe (Swansea)
2019 - River Taff (Cardiff)
2020 - Cancelled due to the COVID-19 pandemic
2021 - Cancelled due to the COVID-19 pandemic
2022 - River Tawe (Swansea)

See also

Welsh Amateur Rowing Association
Swansea University Rowing Club
Welsh Varsity
The Boat Race
The Boat Race of the North
Scottish Boat Race

References

External links
Swansea University Rowing Club website
Cardiff University Boat Club website

Cardiff University
Swansea University
Boat race
Sport in Swansea
Rowing in Wales
Student sport in Wales
Student sport rivalries in the United Kingdom
Annual sporting events in the United Kingdom
Annual events in Wales
2006 establishments in Wales
Recurring sporting events established in 2006
University rowing competitions in the United Kingdom